Club Social y Deportivo Sporting Victoria (sometimes referred as Sporting Victoria) is a Peruvian football club, playing in the city of Bagua Grande, Amazonas, Peru.

History
The Club Social y Deportivo Sporting Victoria was founded on May 25, 1964.

In 2015 Copa Perú, the club classified to the Provincial Stage, but was eliminated by Miguel Grau (Cumba) in the First Stage.

In 2017 Liga Departamental de Amazonas, the club was eliminated in the Group Stage.

In 2019 Copa Perú, the club classified to the National Stage, but was eliminated when finished in 46th place.

Honours

Regional
Liga Departamental de Amazonas:
Runner-up (1): 2019

Liga Provincial de Utcubamba:
Runner-up (1): 2019

Liga Distrital de Bagua Grande:
Runner-up (3): 2015, 2017, 2019

See also
List of football clubs in Peru
Peruvian football league system

References

External links
 

Football clubs in Peru
Association football clubs established in 1964
1964 establishments in Peru